Mamuniyeh (also Romanized as Ma’mūnīyeh) is a city and capital of Zarandieh County, Markazi Province, Iran.  At the 2006 census, its population was 17,337, in 4,672 families.

Moosa Farzaneh was a well-known philanthropist, educator and a highly respected public figure of Mamuniyeh. He was of Mirza Hakim Yazdi descent from the city of Yazd, who made Mamuniyeh his home. His vision, love and dedication in addition to his significant contributions in both education and development brought many of the modern infrastructures and amenities to the community, which resulted in the prosperity of the city as well as the county.

References

Cities in Markazi Province
Populated places in Zarandieh County